Iñaki Echaniz (born 2 September 1993) is a French politician from the Socialist Party who has represented Pyrénées-Atlantiques's 4th constituency in the National Assembly since 2022.

Early life 
Echaniz's background comes from his Basque grandparents, originally from Azpeitia and Beasain in Gipuzkoa (Spain). They came to settle in Oloron-Sainte-Marie in 1968.

Political career 
In parliament he is part of the Socialist group and sits on the Cultural and Education Affairs Committee.

See also 

 List of deputies of the 16th National Assembly of France

References 

Living people
1993 births
People from Oloron-Sainte-Marie
French Basque politicians
French people of Basque descent
21st-century French politicians

Members of Parliament for Pyrénées-Atlantiques
Deputies of the 16th National Assembly of the French Fifth Republic
Socialist Party (France) politicians